Ancylosternus morio is a species of beetle in the family Cerambycidae. It was described by Johan Christian Fabricius in 1787.

Subspecies
 Ancylosternus morio albicornis Erichson, 1847 
 Ancylosternus morio morio (Fabricius, 1787)

Distribution
This species can be found in Bolivia, Brazil, Colombia, French Guiana, Peru and Venezuela.

References

 Biolib
 Cerambycoidea
 Cerambycidae (coleoptera) da Colômbia

Trachyderini
Beetles described in 1787